Alleghany County is an American county located on the far western edge of Commonwealth of Virginia. It is bordered by the Allegheny Mountains, from which the county derives its name, and it is the northernmost part of the Roanoke Region.  The county seat is Covington. As of the 2020 census, the population was 15,223.

The county was created in 1822 from parts of Botetourt County, Bath County, and Monroe County (now in West Virginia).  At the time, the majority of the population lived around Covington, and the primary cash crop then was hemp, which was used for rope production.

History
Alleghany County was established on January 5, 1822, by an act of the Virginia General Assembly.  The new county was formed from parts of Botetourt, Bath, and Monroe (now West Virginia) counties, with most of the population centered in the new county seat in Covington. Alleghany County was named for the Allegheny Mountains, which border the western edge of the county.

When the county was established, the principal export was hemp, used for rope production in Richmond.  However, as hemp demand and prices declined, the farmers of Alleghany switched to grain, hay and livestock production.

During the American Civil War, the iron for the CSS Virginia (Merrimac) came from Longdale Furnace in the county. Regiments from Alleghany County were at the surrender at Appomattox.

Geography

Adjacent counties
Bath County – north
Rockbridge County – east
Botetourt County – southeast
Craig County – south
Monroe County, West Virginia – southwest
Greenbrier County, West Virginia – west

National protected areas
George Washington National Forest (part)
United States National Radio Quiet Zone (part)

Demographics

2020 census

Note: the US Census treats Hispanic/Latino as an ethnic category. This table excludes Latinos from the racial categories and assigns them to a separate category. Hispanics/Latinos can be of any race.

2000 Census
As of the census of 2000, there were 12,926 people, 5,149 households, and 3,866 families residing in the county.  The population density was 29 people per square mile (11/km2).  There were 5,812 housing units at an average density of 13 per square mile (5/km2).  The racial makeup of the county was 96.35% White, 2.45% Black or African American, 0.21% Native American, 0.24% Asian, 0.02% Pacific Islander, 0.20% from other races, and 0.53% from two or more races.  0.36% of the population were Hispanic or Latino of any race. 42.9% were of American, 11.6% German, 11.0% English and 9.8% Irish ancestry according to Census 2000.

There were 5,149 households, out of which 29.90% had children under the age of 18 living with them, 63.20% were married couples living together, 8.10% had a female householder with no husband present, and 24.90% were non-families. 22.20% of all households were made up of individuals, and 10.50% had someone living alone who was 65 years of age or older.  The average household size was 2.46 and the average family size was 2.85.

The age distribution is 22.80% under the age of 18, 6.20% from 18 to 24, 26.80% from 25 to 44, 28.50% from 45 to 64, and 15.70% who were 65 years of age or older.  The median age was 41 years. For every 100 females there were 99.60 males.  For every 100 females age 18 and over, there were 95.30 males.

The median income for a household in the county was $38,545, and the median income for a family was $45,843. Males had a median income of $35,120 versus $20,855 for females. The per capita income for the county was $19,635.  About 4.90% of families and 7.10% of the population were below the poverty line, including 8.60% of those under age 18 and 10.80% of those age 65 or over.

In 2000, Clifton Forge was an independent city separate from the county. However, in 2001, Clifton Forge relinquished its city charter and reincorporated as a town; as a town, it is now a part of Alleghany County. The 2000 population of what is now Alleghany County (including Clifton Forge) was 17,215. The article includes geographic data from before and after the reincorporation of Clifton Forge into the county.

Government

Board of Supervisors
Boiling Springs district: Shannon P. Cox (I)
Clifton Forge East district: Dr. Ronald Goings (I)
Clifton Forge West district: Gregory Dodd (I)
Covington district: James M. Griffith (I)
Falling Spring district: G. Matt Garten (I)
Jackson River district: Stephen A. Bennett (I)
Sharon district: Cletus W. Nicely (I)

Constitutional officers
Clerk of the Circuit Court: Debra N. Byer (I)
Commissioner of the Revenue: Valerie N. Bruffey (I)
Commonwealth's Attorney: Ann Gardner(I)
Sheriff: Kevin W. Hall (I)
Treasurer: Teresa Brown (I)

Alleghany County is represented by Democrat R. Creigh Deeds in the Virginia Senate, Republican Terry Austin in the Virginia House of Delegates, and Republican H. Morgan Griffith in the U.S. House of Representatives.

Economy
The county economy is dominated by WestRock, which operates a paperboard mill in Covington, the second largest on the East Coast and an extrusion and converting facility in Low Moor. Alleghany County is within close proximity to The Homestead in Bath County and The Greenbrier in White Sulfur Springs. Residents also commute to Lewisburg, Lexington, and Roanoke for employment. Covington has a team in the Valley Baseball League called the Lumberjacks.

Transportation
Amtrak, the national passenger rail service, provides service to the Clifton Forge station ( away from Covington) with the Cardinal route. Clifton Forge serves a major locomotive fuel facility for CSX Transportation.

The area is served by Interstate 64 (east-west) and U.S. 220 (north-south), offering interstate truck access to the area.

Major highways

Education
Alleghany County is serviced by one high school, Alleghany High School (grades 9–12); one middle school, Clifton Middle School (grades 6–8), and three pre-kindergarten to grade 5 elementary schools: Callaghan Elementary, Mountain View Elementary and Sharon Elementary. The county also contains one Virginia state governors school, the Jackson River Governor's School; one technical center, the Jackson River Technical Center; and the Mountain Gateway Community College.

Politics

Communities
Though it is the county seat, Covington is an independent city, and thus is not part of Alleghany County.

Towns
 Clifton Forge
 Iron Gate

Census-designated places
 Callaghan
 Low Moor
 Selma

Other unincorporated communities

 Alleghany
 Backbone
 Boiling Spring
 Clearwater Park
 Clifdale
 Cliftondale Park
 Crows
 Earlehurst
 Fairview Heights
 Falling Spring
 Griffith
 Harrington
 Hematite
 Intervale
 Iron Hill Springs
 Jordan Mines
 Kincaid
 Longdale
 Longdale Furnace
 Mallow
 Moss Run
 Nicelytown
 Oakwood Forest
 Potts Creek
 Rayon Terrace
 Rich Patch
 Rich Patch Mines
 Stonewall
 Sweet Chalybeate
 Valley View
 Westwood Place

See also
National Register of Historic Places listings in Alleghany County, Virginia

References

External links
 “Powerlessness and Pollution in Alleghany County, Virginia: A Historical Analysis of Paternalism and Economic Coercion in Appalachia and its Relationship with Environmental Degradation″
  History and Photographs of the Alleghany Highlands
 Alleghany Highlands Genealogy Society
 Alleghany County, Virginia
Travel & Tourism

 
Virginia counties
1822 establishments in Virginia
Populated places established in 1822
Counties on the James River (Virginia)
Counties of Appalachia